Timbrebongie Shire was a local government area in the Orana region of New South Wales, Australia.

Timbrebongie Shire was proclaimed on 7 March 1906,  with offices based in the town of Narromine.

The Local Government Areas Amalgamation Act 1980 saw the amalgamation of Timbrebongie Shire with the Municipality of Narromine to form Narromine Shire on 1 January 1981.

References

Former local government areas of New South Wales
1906 establishments in Australia
1981 disestablishments in Australia